Doug Carn (born July 14, 1948) is an American jazz musician from St. Augustine, Florida, formerly married to Jean Carne and known for his several albums released for Black Jazz Records. Carn is a multi-instrumentalist known primarily for his work on organ and piano.

Career
Carn studied oboe and composition at Jacksonville University from 1965 to 1967, then finished his education at Georgia State College in 1969. He also taught piano and jazz improvisation at Jacksonville University for several years.

He, along with Chris Lightburn and Rev. H. L. Patterson of St. Mary's Baptist Church, founded the Lincolnville Restoration and Development Committee in his home town of St. Augustine in 1979. One of the group's projects was the organizing, in 1979, of the annual Lincolnville Festival, which has continued into the 21st century and become one of the Ancient City's leading cultural events.

Carn recorded several albums on the Black Jazz Records label during the 1970s that have since achieved cult classic status, including Infant Eyes, Adam's Apple, and Revelation.  He worked with Nat Adderley, Earth, Wind & Fire, Shirley Horn, Lou Donaldson, Stanley Turrentine, and Irene Reid. In 1997 Carn and other jazz organists including Dr. Lonnie Smith and Reuben Wilson recorded Bongobop with The Essence Allstars that featured both solo performances and a duet with Joey DeFrancesco. He was featured on drummer Cindy Blackman's (of Lenny Kravitz fame) album Another Lifetime. Since 2010 Carn and ex-wife Jean have been performing and touring together; including weekend appearances in 2012 at Ronnie Scott's in London and in 2013 at Lincoln Center and the Iridium in NYC and the Savannah Jazz Festival. His release My Spirit (2015), included live performances of selections from the Black Jazz albums, peaking at No. 46 on the JazzWeek chart.

Discography

As leader 
 1969: The Doug Carn Trio (Savoy)
 1971: Infant Eyes (Black Jazz)
 1972: Spirit of the New Land (Black Jazz) with Jean Carn
 1973: Revelation (Black Jazz) with Jean Carn
 1974: Adam's Apple (Black Jazz)
 1976: Higher Ground (Ovation) with Jean Carn; compilation of Black Jazz material
 1977: Al Rahman! Cry of the Floridian Tropic Son (Tablighi Records) as Abdul Rahim Ibrahim
 1995: In A Mellow Tone (Lighthouse Records)
 1996: The Best of Doug Carn (Universal Sound) compilation of Black Jazz material
 2001: A New Incentive "Firm Roots" (Black Jazz)
 2015: My Spirit [live] (Doodlin' Records)
 2019: Free For All (Doodlin' Records)
 2020: Jazz Is Dead 5 (Jazz Is Dead) with Adrian Younge and Ali Shaheed Muhammad

With The Essence Allstars 
 1997: Bongobop (Hip Bop Essence)

As sideman 

With Calvin Keys
 Vertical Clearance (2005) 
With Cindy Blackman
 Another Lifetime (2010)
With Curtis Fuller
 Keep It Simple (Savant, 2005)
With Intuit
 Intuit (2004)
With Melvin Van Peebles
 As Serious as a Heart-Attack (1974)
With Wallace Roney
 Home (HighNote, 2010 [2012])

References 

1948 births
Living people
American jazz composers
American male jazz composers
American jazz pianists
American male pianists
American jazz singers
American jazz saxophonists
American male saxophonists
American jazz oboists
Male oboists
Black Jazz Records artists
Savoy Records artists
Jacksonville University alumni
Savannah State University alumni
Jazz musicians from Florida
20th-century American pianists
21st-century American saxophonists
21st-century American pianists
20th-century American male musicians
21st-century American male musicians